Sawnie Robertson (October 5, 1850 – June 21, 1892) was a justice of the Supreme Court of Texas from October 1885 to September 1886.

References

Justices of the Texas Supreme Court
1850 births
1892 deaths
19th-century American judges